Masang Mayoso is a remote village in Tonkolili District in the Northern Province of Sierra Leone. The population of the village is almost entirely inhabited by the Temne people and their language also called Temne is by far the most widely spoken language in the village. Masang Mayoso is one of only few places in Sierra Leone where the majority of the people do not understand or speak the Krio language (the most widely spoken language in Sierra Leone).

The village is the birthplace of Foday Sankoh, former leader and founder of the  Revolutionary United Front (RUF), a rebel group that fought a failed ten-year civil war against the government of Sierra Leone, starting in 1991 and ending in 2002. It later developed into a political party, which existed until 2007.

Villages in Sierra Leone
Northern Province, Sierra Leone